Radio Ilijaš is a Bosnian local public radio station, broadcasting from Ilijaš, Bosnia and Herzegovina.

Radio Ilijaš was launched on 6 April 1978 by the municipal council of Ilijaš. In Yugoslavia and in SR Bosnia and Herzegovina, it was part of local/municipal Radio Sarajevo network affiliate. This radio station broadcasts a variety of programs such as music, sport, local news and talk shows. Program is mainly produced in Bosnian language.

Estimated number of potential listeners of Radio Ilijaš is around 57,793. Radiostation is also available in Sarajevo (Sarajevo Canton region) and in municipalities : Vareš, Visoko and Breza.

Frequencies
The program is currently broadcast at 3 frequencies:

 Ilijaš 
 Vareš 
 Ilijaš

See also 
List of radio stations in Bosnia and Herzegovina

References

External links 
 www.radioilijas.ba
 Communications Regulatory Agency of Bosnia and Herzegovina

Ilijaš
Mass media in Sarajevo
Radio stations established in 1978